Frédéric Valabrègue (12 January 1952, Marseille) is a French writer, author of four novels, three autobiographical narratives and numerous writings on art. In 2011, he received the Prix Louis-Guilloux for his novel Le Candidat. His books are mostly published by 

In addition he teaches art history at Beaux-Arts de Marseille-Luminy.

Works 
1984: Vues d’abandon,  Lettres de Casse
1985: Rumeur,  Collodion
1989: La Ville sans nom, novel, POL
1992: Agricole et Béchamel, novel, POL
1994: J’ai découvert un nouveau monde, Kazimir Sévérinovitch Malévitch, biographie, Images en manœuvres,
1994: , peintre et écrivain, monography written in collaboration with Bernard Lattay, Editions Voix Richard Meier
1998: Le Vert-Clos, narration, POL
2002: Asthme, narration, POL
2005: Les Mauvestis, novel, POL
2005: , interview with Pierre Manuel, Grandes Méridianes
2009: Carlos Kusnir, art book, Analogues
2010: Ceccarelli, art book, André Dimanche
2010: Le candidat, novel, POL
2015: Grant'autre, narration, POL

References

External links 
 Frédéric Valabrègue on the site of the École Supérieure d'art et de design Marseille-Méditerranée
 "Le Candidat", de Frédéric Valabrègue : qu'un pas de plus efface la limite on Le Monde 25/11/2010
 Frédéric Valabrègue Quarante ans après on L'Humanité 4 June 1905
 Frédéric Valabrègue Grant'autre on YouTube

20th-century French non-fiction writers
21st-century French non-fiction writers
Prix Louis Guilloux winners
1952 births
Writers from Marseille
Living people